Mường Lay is a town of Điện Biên Province in the Northwest region of Vietnam.

Geography

Administrative divisions
Muong Cha has 3 administrative units, including two wards (phường) and one commune (xã):

Sông Đà (ward)
Na Lay (ward)
Lay Nưa (commune)

Climate

References

Districts of Điện Biên province
Populated places in Điện Biên province
County-level towns in Vietnam
Điện Biên province